In cosmology, the halo mass function is a mass distribution of dark matter halos.  Specifically, it gives the number density of dark matter halos per mass interval.

References

External links
Web tool to create generic halo mass functions
Halo Mass Functions on the NMSU website

Physical cosmology
Dark_matter